Manga Bell is a Cameroonian surname.

Notable people with the surname include:

 Manga Ndumbe Bell (1838–1898), a leader of the Duala people
 Rudolf Duala Manga Bell (1873–1914), a Duala king and resistance leader
 Alexandre Douala Manga Bell (1897–1966), son of above, Duala leader, German officer and French politician